Sari Qayah or Sari Qayeh or Sariqayeh may refer to:
 Sari Qayah, Ardabil
 Sari Qayah, Hashtrud, East Azerbaijan Province
 Sari Qayeh, Malekan, East Azerbaijan Province
 Sari Qayeh, Maragheh, East Azerbaijan Province
 Sari Qayah, Sarab, East Azerbaijan Province